Macrocoma rubripes is a species of leaf beetle from Europe, Asia and possibly North Africa. It was first described by Ludwig Wilhelm Schaufuss in 1862, as a species of Pseudocolaspis.

Subspecies
There are two subspecies of M. rubripes:

 Macrocoma rubripes rubripes: The nominotypical subspecies. It is distributed in the Balkan Peninsula, Cyprus, Turkey, Syria and the Caucasus. It has also been reported from Saudi Arabia, Egypt, Libya, and Algeria.
 Macrocoma rubripes turkmena Lopatin, 1976: Found in Turkmenistan.

Some authors recognise a third subspecies, Macrocoma rubripes balcanica (Apfelbeck, 1912), distributed in Bulgaria and Northern Dobruja.

References

rubripes
Beetles of Europe
Beetles of Asia